Archibald "Archie" Reith Low, MA (Cantab) FRAeS (31 December 1878, in Aberdeen – 21 January 1969) was a British pilot and aeronautics pioneer. He designed the Vickers F.B.5. and Vickers E.F.B.1. According to Mervyn O'Gorman, Low coined the term "drag" to refer to aerodynamic drag.

Life

Low was one of eight children of his father, a Church of Scotland minister and Jane Stuart Reith, aunt to Lord Reith. He was educated at George Watson's College and Edinburgh University, and at Clare College, Cambridge.

Low held the rank of Second Lieutenant in the City of London Imperial Volunteers.
He held the rank of Acting Lieutenant Commander in the Royal Navy Volunteer Reserve attached to the Royal Naval Air Service (RNAS).
When on 1 April 1918, the RNAS was merged with the British Army's Royal Flying Corps to form the Royal Air Force (the world's first independent air force), he held the rank of Major (in the Royal Air Force). He had therefore held a commission in all three services. He was awarded the star (S.), Victory (V.) Medal and the British War Medal (BS.).; they were irreverently known as Pip, Squeak and Wildfred, respectively.

Career

Publications

 Normal Elliptic Functions (University of Toronto Press 1950)

See also 
List of pilots awarded an Aviator's Certificate by the Royal Aero Club in 1910

References

1878 births
1969 deaths
British aerospace engineers
Scottish aviators
Scottish aerospace engineers